Sir Walter Richard Nugent, 4th Baronet (12 December 1865 – 12 November 1955), was an Irish baronet, politician and member of parliament (MP) in the House of Commons of the United Kingdom of Great Britain and Ireland from 1907 to 1918.

Nugent was elected to the House of Commons as an Irish Parliamentary Party MP for South Westmeath at a by-election in 1907, and held the seat through the January and December 1910 elections, until 1918.

In 1896, he had succeeded to the baronetcy of Donore in Multyfarnham, County of Westmeath. He was a member of Seanad Éireann of the Irish Free State from 1928 to 1931.

He was the last High Sheriff of Westmeath in 1922.

References

External links

 

1865 births
1955 deaths
Baronets in the Baronetage of the United Kingdom
High Sheriffs of County Westmeath
Irish Parliamentary Party MPs
Members of the Parliament of the United Kingdom for County Westmeath constituencies (1801–1922)
Politicians from County Westmeath
UK MPs 1906–1910
UK MPs 1910
UK MPs 1910–1918
Members of the 1925 Seanad
Members of the 1928 Seanad
Independent members of Seanad Éireann